Bernard Ngumba Irungu (born 1 February 1976) is an amateur boxer from Kenya who competed in the 2008 Olympics at the men's flyweight competition after qualifying at the 2nd AIBA African 2008 Olympic Qualifying Tournament where he finished second behind Cassius Chiyanika. In Beijing, he lost in his first fight to Tulashboy Doniyorov.

External links
sports-reference
Qualifier
NBC data
Yahoo data

1976 births
Living people
Flyweight boxers
Boxers at the 2008 Summer Olympics
Olympic boxers of Kenya
Kenyan male boxers